The National Reconciliation Council is a North Korean organization whose purpose is to facilitate visits from South Korea to North Korea. Founded on 8 June 1998, its chairman is Kim Yong-dae. The first visit organized by the body was a 2001 visit to Mount Kumgang commemorating the 2000 inter-Korean summit. Most cultural, political, and religious visits from South Korea are through the National Reconciliation Council. The organization is occasionally cited in official news releases from the Korean Central News Agency.

See also

 Democratic Front for the Reunification of the Fatherland
 Committee for the Peaceful Reunification of the Fatherland

References

External links
 

Government of North Korea